The 2012–13 Biathlon World Cup – World Cup 2 was held in Hochfilzen, Austria, from 7 December until 9 December 2012.

Schedule of events

Medal winners

Men

Women

Achievements

 Best performance for all time

 , 15th place in Sprint
 , 25th place in Sprint
 , 37th place in Sprint
 , 56th place in Sprint and 55th place in Pursuit
 , 58th place in Sprint and Pursuit
 , 62nd place in Sprint
 , 98th place in Sprint
 , 12th place in Sprint
 , 13th place in Sprint and 10th place in Pursuit
 , 16th place in Sprint and 8th place in Pursuit
 , 24th place in Sprint
 , 32nd place in Sprint
 , 33rd place in Sprint and 28th in Pursuit
 , 37th place in Sprint
 , 43rd place in Sprint
 , 61st place in Sprint
 , 62nd place in Sprint
 , 66th place in Sprint
 , 84th place in Sprint
 , 1st place in Pursuit

 First World Cup race

 , 97th place in Sprint

References 

- World Cup 2
Biathlon World Cup - World Cup 2
December 2012 sports events in Europe
Biathlon competitions in Austria
Sport in Tyrol (state)